Ampelos (lit."Vine") or Ampelus (Latin) was a personification of the grapevine and lover of  Dionysus in Greek and Roman mythology. He was a satyr that either turned into a constellation or the grape vine, due to Dionysus.

Mythology

Nonnus
In Nonnus's etiology, Ampelos is a beautiful satyr youth, who was loved by Dionysus, and whose death was foreseen by the god. There are two versions of his death and Dionysus's reaction to it. According to Nonnus, Ampelos was gored to death by a wild bull after he mocked the goddess Selene, a scene described as follows:

"[Ampelos, love of Dionysos, rode upon the back of a wild bull:] He shouted boldly to the fullfaced Moon (Mene)—'Give me best, Selene, horned driver of cattle! Now I am both—I have horns and I ride a bull!'

So he called out boasting to the round Moon. Selene looked with a jealous eye through the air, to see how Ampelos rode on the murderous marauding bull. She sent him a cattlechasing gadfly; and the bull, pricked continually all over by the sharp sting, galloped away like a horse through pathless tracts [it then threw and gored him to death]"

Upset by his death, Dionysus transformed Ampelos's body into the first grape vine and created wine from his blood.

Ovid

The second version involves grape vines in a different manner. According to Ovid: 
"the reckless youth fell picking gaudy grapes on a branch. Liber [Dionysos] lifted the lost boy to the stars," turning him into one of the stars of the constellation Vindemitor or Vindiatrix (better known as Boötes).

Dryad
Various ampelosealso "Ampelos" in the singularalso appear in Greek mythology a variety of hamadryad.

In the European tradition 
During the Middle Ages and Renaissance Ampelos was not known. In the New Age and later, his image is found only occasionally. The myth about him was "rediscovered" in Europe in 17th century, when the first translations of "The Acts of Dionysus" were published. Such artists as Jacob Matham and Jan Mil took part in their design. An image of Ampelos can also be found, for example, in the books "Etruscan, Greek and Roman antiquities" (1766) by Pierre François Hugh d'Hankarville (English), "Stories of ancient and modern wines" (1824) by Dr. Alexander Henderson. The image of Ampelos appears in the works of Martin Opitz (1622), Heinrich Heine ("The Gods in Exile" (1853)) and Matthew Arnold ("The Lost Wanderer" (1898)), Roberto Calasso (1988). Some researchers also point out that the myth of Dionysus and Ampelos was one of the sources of inspiration for the French homosexual writer André Gide.

Notes

References 
 Athenaeus of Naucratis, The Deipnosophists or Banquet of the Learned. London. Henry G. Bohn, York Street, Covent Garden. 1854. Online version at the Perseus Digital Library.
Athenaeus of Naucratis, Deipnosophistae. Kaibel. In Aedibus B.G. Teubneri. Lipsiae. 1887. Greek text available at the Perseus Digital Library.
Nonnus of Panopolis, Dionysiaca translated by William Henry Denham Rouse (1863-1950), from the Loeb Classical Library, Cambridge, MA, Harvard University Press, 1940.  Online version at the Topos Text Project.
 Nonnus of Panopolis, Dionysiaca. 3 Vols. W.H.D. Rouse. Cambridge, MA., Harvard University Press; London, William Heinemann, Ltd. 1940-1942. Greek text available at the Perseus Digital Library.
 Publius Ovidius Naso, Fasti translated by James G. Frazer. Online version at the Topos Text Project.
 Publius Ovidius Naso, Fasti. Sir James George Frazer. London; Cambridge, MA. William Heinemann Ltd.; Harvard University Press. 1933. Latin text available at the Perseus Digital Library.

Satyrs
Greek legendary creatures
Mythological hybrids
Metamorphoses into plants in Greek mythology
Consorts of Dionysus
Selene
LGBT themes in Greek mythology